Jakob Precht Jensen (born 6 November 1998) is a Danish sailor. He competed in the 49er event at the 2020 Summer Olympics.

References

External links
 
 

1998 births
Living people
Danish male sailors (sport)
Olympic sailors of Denmark
Sailors at the 2020 Summer Olympics – 49er
Place of birth missing (living people)